Budafoki Munkás Testedző Egyesület is a professional football club based in Budapest, Hungary.

List of managers
 István Szeder: ?–1952
 János Steiner: 1952
 Ignác Molnár 1953
 Lajos Szollár: 1953–1958
 Ferenc Rudas: 1958–1959
 István Turai: 1959
 Béla Marosvári: 1960–1963
 Bánáti Rezső 1963–1967
 Lajos Csordás 1967–1968
 Sándor Haász: 1968
 Károly Schneider: 1968
 Lajos Szollár: 1968–1971
 Kálmán Mészöly: 1971
 Gyula Dobesch: 1972–1974
 Kálmán Mészöly: 1974–1976
 Gyula Dobesch: 1976–1984
 Győző Megyeri: 1984–1987
 Gyula Dobesch: 1987–1989
 Lőrinc Sárközi: 1989–1993
 József Gáspár: 1993–1994
 Tamás Krivitz: 1994–1995
 Lőrinc Sárközi: 1995–1996
 György Haffner: 1996–1997
 György Szabó: 1997
 Pál Horváth: 1997–1998
 Lajos Schróth 1998
  Lőrinc Sárközi 1999–2000
  József Gáspár 2000–2002
  László Takács 2003–2004
  Pál Horváth: 2004
  Károly Gelei 2005–2008
  Bálint Tóth 2008–2009
  András Dunay: 2009
  Elemér Piski: 2010
  Tibor Patay: 2011
  Lajos Schróth: 2011–2015
  László Dajka: 2015
  László Prukner: 2015–2017
  Bálint Tóth: 2017
  György Gálhidi: 2017–2018
  Bálint Tóth: 2018
  Zoltán Vitelki: 2018
  Csaba Csizmadia: 2018–

References

Budafoki MTE